Fountain Point is a geographic landmark located on the eastern shore of South Lake Leelanau in Suttons Bay Township, Michigan. Its name is derived from a fountain of sparkling artesian spring water, situated on a large point on Lake Leelanau, which has been continuously gushing since 1867. Fountain Point includes a historic resort and other private residences.

See also
Fountain Point Resort

References

External links
 Suttons Bay Township website
 Leelanau Historical Museum and Society
 Maps

Tourist attractions in Leelanau County, Michigan